Johan Herman Bernhard Kuneman  ( – ) was a Dutch governor in the Dutch East Indies and, in his youth, a footballer. He was part of the Netherlands national team, playing one match on 25 October 1908.

From 1933 to 1936 he was governor of East Java and served as a member of the Council of the Dutch East Indies at time he was taken prisoner of the occupying Japanese in World War II. He died in an Internment camp in Central Java, several weeks after the official surrender of the Japanese in the Dutch Indies. He was buried at Menteng Pulo Cemetery, Jakarta.

See also
 List of Dutch international footballers

References

External links
 
 

1886 births
1945 deaths
Governors-General of the Dutch East Indies
Dutch footballers
Netherlands international footballers
People from Purwakarta Regency
HBS Craeyenhout players
Association football defenders
Dutch people who died in Japanese internment camps